Chrysocraspeda convergens is a species of moth in the family Geometridae first described by Jeremy Daniel Holloway in 1997. It is endemic to Borneo.

References

Sterrhinae
Moths described in 1997
Moths of Borneo